In idiomatic English, "the powers that be" (sometimes initialized as TPTB) is a phrase used to refer to those individuals or groups who collectively hold authority over a particular domain. Within this phrase, the word be is an archaic variant of are rather than a subjunctive be. The use of are in this phrase ("the powers that are") is less common. "The powers that were" (TPTW) can also be found.

Origin
The phrase first appeared in the Tyndale Bible, William Tyndale's 1526 translation of the New Testament, as: "Let every soul submit himself unto the authority of the higher powers. There is no power but of God. The powers that be, are ordained of God". In the 1611 King James Version it became, "Let every soul be subject unto the higher powers. For there is no power but of God: The powers that be are ordained of God.", whence it eventually passed into popular language.

Examples
"The powers that be" can refer to a variety of entities that depend on the domain, including
 Governments, both central and local, and the accompanying civil service
 The upper management of a business
 Those who control the dissemination of information
 Controlling bodies in any organization i.e corporation or activity
 Secret societies and cabals

In popular culture
 The Public Enemy song "Fight the Power" features a call to "fight the powers that be." 
 Roger Waters has a song called "The Powers That Be" on his 1987 album Radio Kaos. 
 Death Grips's fourth studio album is called The Powers That B, which is also a reference to this phrase.
 Kendrick Lamar's third studio album To Pimp a Butterfly has the song "King Kunta" which references this phrase.
 Puscifer have a song called "Bread and Circus" on their 2020 album Existential Reckoning, where "powers that be" is mentioned twice in the lyrics - verse 2."

See also
Elite
Omnipotence
Romans 13
Supreme Being

References

External links

English-language idioms
New Testament words and phrases
16th-century neologisms
English phrases